The Gathering of Nations is the largest pow-wow in the United States and North America. It is held annually on the fourth weekend in April, on the Powwow Grounds at Expo NM, in Albuquerque, New Mexico. Over 565 tribes from around the United States and 220 from Canada travel to Albuquerque to participate. 

Dance competitions are held in 36 categories, including different age group categories such as Elders (70+), Golden Age (55+), Adults (19+), Teens, and Tiny Tots. Other competitions include Northern Singers, Southern Singers, Women's Back-up Singing, and competition for Drum Groups and Drummers and various other special competitions. A pageant for Miss Indian World is held each year. The winner is chosen based upon personality, knowledge of tribal traditions, and dancing ability. There is also the Indian Traders Market featuring artists, crafters, and traders selling Native American and Indigenous arts and crafts. 

Additional activities during the festival are held at stage 49, a contemporary music and performance space where native musicians and others experience performance on a professional stage and in front of a large audience. There is also a native horse and rider regalia parade, honoring the horse culture among tribes, and a tee pee village. Gathering of Nations also participates annually in a literacy program, delivering over four thousand books to young children registered to dance.

Gathering of Nations has maintained a high-level traveling show since 1995, with performances throughout USA, Asia, Europe and on Broadway in New York City. The show has also performed on national television, with five live performances on the NBC Today show. The 2010 Gathering of Nations Pow Wow's album A Spirit's Dance won a Grammy award for Best Native American music album at the 53rd Annual Grammy Awards.

The Gathering of Nations Powwow is a family event where everyone is invited. Next Gathering of Nations Powwow is April 28-30, 2022.

Electric 49 
The Electric 49 was an annual Native American Music concert held during the weekend of Pow-wow, but in no way associated with the official events of the Gathering.

The concert was originated/created by the group Red Earth in 1998, and saw eight annual editions since that year.  Since 2006, however, there has not been another festival, as Red Earth remains on hiatus. The Electric 49 focused on highlighting artistically challenging Native American Musicians throughout the Americas, and its goal was to highlight contemporary Native music.

Throughout the years, the Electric 49 has featured Red Earth, Robert Mirabal, Ethnic DeGeneration, Star Nayea, Native Roots, Casper, Querosene Jacare (of Brazil), Cisco, Derek Miller, Stoic Frame, DJ Abel and Quese IMC. True to the diversity of contemporary native music, festival performers have been from across numerous genres including Heavy metal, Reggae, Blues, Hip hop, New Mexico music, and Waila (Chicken Scratch).

See also
Gathering of Nations Pow Wow 1999 (2000)

References

External links
Photo Gallery from 2017 Gathering of Nations Powwow
Gathering of Nations Web Site
Videos from Gathering of Nations
Photos from Gathering of Nations
Live Webcast of the 2019 Gathering of Nations

Dance festivals in the United States
Pow wows
Folk festivals in the United States
Festivals in New Mexico
Religious festivals in the United States
Native American music festivals
Native American history of New Mexico